RIP.ie is an Irish obituary website dedicated to publishing death notices in Ireland. The website allows funeral directors to post death notices on the website without additional costs to the family. It was founded in 2005. As of 2021, the website receives approximately 250,000 visits per day and more than 50 million pages are viewed each month. 2019 accounts show net assets of over €1 million.

History
Jay and Dympna Coleman, based in Dundalk, County Louth, founded the RIP.ie website in 2005.

The website contains a service directory, which lists funeral directors, florists and caterers. It also contains an online shop selling handwritten sympathy cards.

Restrictions on funeral attendances due to the COVID-19 pandemic saw a large increase in online condolences.

The Central Statistics Office (CSO) used RIP.ie in an attempt to calculate excess mortality from March to September 2020, in a study it published in November 2020.

Entrepreneur Mike Feerick, has made a claim to 20% of the shares in the company. Feerick had a business relationship with the Colemans from 2007 to 2010, which was terminated by the Colemans. Legal correspondence over the claim ended in 2011 but resurfaced in 2021 when RIP.ie was reported to be on the market for up to €5 million. The matter was before the Irish High Court.

References

External links
 

2005 establishments in Ireland
Acknowledgements of death
Internet properties established in 2005
Irish news websites